Anna Grobecker, born 27 July 1829 in Breslau (which was then part of the Kingdom of Prussia), died 27 September 1908 in Althofen, Austria, was a German  mezzo-soprano who appeared in many operas and operettas. She was a skilled comic actress and was most popular in "trousers roles".

She was the daughter of opera singers Franz Mejo and Rosa Mejo-Straub, one of their seven children, all of whom had stage careers. Anna was trained as an actress by Carl Herbold and as a singer by her mother.

She made her debut in Magdeburg in 1844, appeared in Leipzig in 1848, and performed in Berlin from 1850 - 1858, where she specialised in soubrette roles.  In 1858, during a guest appearance in Budapest, she was seen by Johann Nestroy, who brought her to Vienna. There she appeared at the Carltheater in operettas, especially in the works of Jacques Offenbach and Franz von Suppé, until 1871.

Anna Grobecker was the first operetta singer to be invited to perform for the Imperial Court in Vienna, in 1861. In 1865, she made a guest appearance at the Meysels-Theater, Berlin, creating the trousers part of Ganymed in Suppe's Die schöne Galathée. In 1869, she made guest appearances in Paris, by the arrangement of Offenbach, and was known as "the Queen of the trousers roles". She was married to actor Phillip Grobecker between 1856 and 1860.

She retired in 1874 and divided her time between Italy and Austria.

References 

German operatic mezzo-sopranos
19th-century German women opera singers
1829 births
1908 deaths
Musicians from Wrocław